Majuska Török de Szendrő ( Puskas de Ditro), also known as Djavidan Hanem (June 15, 1877, Philadelphia, Pennsylvania, USA – August 5, 1968, Graz, Austria), was a Hungarian noble, second spouse of the Khedive Abbas II of Egypt.

Background 

Majuska (English corresponding to May), daughter of Tivadar Puskas de Ditro and Countess Sophie Vetter von der Lilie, was born in Philadelphia, USA. Sophie's family, despite her name, is Hungarian, as all of her female ascendants were of Hungarian descent. The family Vetter was considered to be related to the house of Valois (von der Lilie), so they were related to almost all European monarchies. Tivadar came from a Szekler family. Sophie's first husband, Count Joseph Török de Szendrő, with whom she married according to the Roman Catholic ceremony on 28 August 1870, in the now ruined Hohenwang Castle in Mürzthal. This marriage proved unjustified, they left each other in 1873 and were then officially divorced after Sophie's conversion to the Reformed religion in June 1881. Both members of the couple later remarried. Sophie married Tivadar Puskas in London in March 1882, and later, after Tivadar's death in 1893, with the painter Carl Cserna in 1896. In 1876, Sophie met Tivadar in Paris, then she traveled to Bremen, from there by boat called Neckar, where she arrived in New York on 21 July 1876. Joseph Török de Szendrö never entered American soil. 

At the time of Majuska's birth, Sophie's divorce had not yet been resolved, so Majuska was not consciously baptized or registered by her parents, nor were her two sisters born later. Nicknames were used in the family to address, Majuska's nickname was May. Tivadar Puskas moved to Paris on December 24, 1878, where Maggie was born on January 5, 1881. At the end of 1884, the family moved to Budapest, where the youngest girl, Thea, was born on November 9, 1886. In 1890, Sophie moved to Vienna with May, presumably to care for her mother. Between March 1891 and February 1894, Sophie Puskas owned the Waasen castle and estate, but they did not live there with May. 

In January 1892, Max Hussarek von Heinlein, the later Austrian Prime Minister, a former teacher of Abbas, traveled to Egypt to take on the duties of personal secretary, taking with him the unbaptized May, less than 15 years old. For the sake of the morganatic marriage, he introduced the little girl to the ruler as Countess May Török. This gracious lie is one of the foundations of the misconception currently prevalent. The other is that some Hungarian journalists identified her with her older sister, the real Countess Marianne Török, who was already the wife of Baron Arthur Müller de Klingspor, a bombardier lieutenant. In Egypt, May was therefore known as Countess May Török, so she later used this name there until her conversion to Islam.

Sophie and Tivadar entered into an inheritance contract to secure the inheritance of their daughters, which was presented by the widow Sophie Puskas in the lawsuits following the death of Tivadar Puskas on March 16, 1893, and the Hungarian Royal Court named the minor daughters accordingly, Majuska Puskas and Margit Puskas and Theodora Puskas. So Majuska Puskas is the official name of the later Djavidan Hanum. She was still in Egypt in March 1893, so his father was unable to attend his funeral fairly quickly, but later left Egypt. On March 26, 1895, she gave a piano concert in the "Vigadó" in Budapest, playing pieces by Grieg, Baderevszky, Mendelssohn and Schumann.

Marriage 

In 1900, Majuska returned to Egypt and entered into a secret, “private” marriage contract with the ruler. This presumably happened in July, because the newspapers then started publishing about the Khedive that he is holding a foreign woman in the harem . Due to an unusual family relationship in Islamic culture and hidden from the public, Egypt’s population and political elite assumed Majuska as an immoral woman, a kind of Viennese dancer. On May 9, 1910, she adopted the Islamic faith, and in the record she gave the name May Török, known in Egypt 17 years ago. She never used that name again after that. She was forced to keep the secret of her descent for the rest of her life, keeping her new religion and the new Muslim name. The official marriage took place on February 28, 1910, with the Grand Mufti of Egypt officiating. 

Majuska converted to Islam in the presence of the Grand Mufti. She was then called Princess Djavidan Hanem, wife of the Khedive of Egypt. Abbas was separated from his first spouse, Ikbal Hanim, a former slave in his mother's household.

As consort 

May accompanied the khedive on his travels to Turkey and Europe as well as inside Egypt, something unknown before. As court protocol disapproved of women from participating in state events, Marianna, with the complicity of her spouse, attended official receptions dressed up as a man. It was as a young palace official "dressed up in an irritating stuffy high collar and tarboosh that I accompanied the Khedive on 8 February 1909, at the laying of the final stone during the heightening of the Aswan Dam", she describes in her memoirs. On one of these occasions, forgetting she was supposed to be a man, the Khedive looked affectionately at her and asked: "Mon amour, est-ce que tu n'es pas fatiguée?", which shocked people standing close by.

In her own memoirs, "Harem" published in Berlin in 1930, attempts to describe the life of women in the confined environment of the Sultanic and Khedivial haramliks. She claimed to have an active role in the creation of Tchibukli Saray right from its drawing board, assigned and approved the landscaping of the palace gardens. As a member of the Red Cross she brought solace to victims of the first Balkan War of 1912. Marianna entertained wives of foreign dignitaries at Mostorod Palace playing the piano. She staged seances, which were cancelled by Abbas.

In an article published March 3, 1928 in Nationalzeitung, Abbas Hilmi's former Hungarian Kelemen Árvay, described Djavidan Hanem as: "a rare beauty and an intelligent warmhearted lady who had a soothing influence on the often petulant Khedive ... She lived in splendor in Mostorod Palace near Matarieh. The fantastic property had a large garden and extensive agriculture domains whose revenue was assigned to her. She was the good spirit for Europeans at the Khedivial court."

Divorce 
Marianna and Abbas divorced in 1913. The reason was Abbas's new relationship with Georgette Mesny, a.k.a. Andrée de Lusange, whom he met at Maxim's in Paris the previous summer. According to Kelemen A'rvay, they returned to Egypt together. Lusange was described as "a 20 years old short, lean, heavily painted woman who distributed her favors for 20 francs and once in the khedive's entourage spied for the French government." She was also blamed for Marianna's departure: "It was her intrigues that pushed Djavidan Hanem to leave the palace and return to Europe."

Later life 
The growing Austro-Hungarian and German influence did not correspond to the British colonial aspirations, so the marriage was accompanied by many unfounded and defamatory attacks, which in Hungary can be linked to the names of journalists Jenö Rakosi, Emil Szomory and Kornel Tabori. Djavidan Hanum traveled through Opatija to Budapest and then to Vienna in May 1913 and did not return to Egypt. On August 7, 1913, the Alexendria Sharia Court declared the divorce. He did not return to Hungary due to the threat of undeclared attacks and recognition, so she settled on the Austrian side of the Monarchy after the divorce. On April 24, 1917, a clothing and beauty salon used under Wiesingerstrasse 3 in the 1st district of Vienna was opened. On November 1, 1922, the Ottoman Empire ceased to exist. Djavidan Hanum became stateless at the age of 45, presumably moving to Germany at that time, where he established his existence as an artist. In 1925, Kirstner & Siegel printed his scores in Leipzig. For example, "three songs, a voice, and a flute; 1. He climbs up through the lattice window. 2. Our garden is surrounded by a high wall. 3. I dig the grave in silence. Total 7 pages, price: 1.5M. Composer: Seherezade Djavidan.

According to the present knowledge, 7 radio games survived, he made music, gave piano concerts, wrote short stories, and film and theater scripts remained. 01/06/1927 Illustrated Kronen Zeitung. The title of an article in the Viennese daily: A Royal Film Actress. The article is illustrated with a 50-year photo by Djavidan. The divorced wife of former Egyptian Khedive Abbas Hilmi II has starred as a film actress and is trying to star in an oriental film written for her. The princess who is currently in Berlin is a great beauty. She is still the rich ex-Khedive universal earth lady who lived in Constantinople for years.

June 2, 1929 Arbeitermille. Graz edition worksheet. The title of the article is Gülnehal. He publishes the short story. Then Djavidan Hanum's autobiographically inspired book Harem was published in 1930 in German and then in 1931 in English. In editing the book, her youngest sister, Theodora Puskas, at the time was Mrs. Thea Rhonay, supported her. December 4, 1930 Der Wieneras publishes Djavidan's short story "The Wedding of a Pasha's Daughter". Djavidan's piano knowledge was perfected by Eugen d'Albert, and his literary beginnings were smoothed by Gerhart Hauptmann. 19.2.09.22 Radio vom 24 bis 30. RAVAG. Booklet 52. Vienna. Transmitters: Berlin 716kHz, Stettin 1058kHz, Magdeburg 1058kHz. 15:20 The Mysterious East. Interview with J.H., Princess Djavidan “Hamune”. On February 28, 1934, after the arrest of Georg von Sosnowski, he moved back to Austria. On June 9, 1934, she was already interviewing in Vienna with Dr. Theodor Sapper, a nationalist at Die Stunde. Wednesday, March 8, 1935 5:05 PM Lady watch. A look at the world. 25 minute radio show. On March 15, 1936, she reads his own works on the German tax in Brno. On the 20th, Hamman goes on German taxes and "The Book That Was Never Written" reads from them on the 26th. On April 24, the radio play Wiegen (Cradle) will take place on the Radio stage, which will be repeated on the 30th of the Linz station. Presentation of the author on May 1, repetition on May 7, newspaper article with the 59-year-old author. August 21, 1938 "Der Kakteeentisch" is happy music on Radio Vienna, where she plays his own composition on piano and then repeats on the 23rd. April 26, 1940 "Conversation on Egypt and the English", Vienna Tax, replay on May 4. On August 17, 1941, the Neues Wiener Tagblatt published the short story Hamman. In 1942, Djavidan Hanum realizes that she did not have proper identity papers, so she asked Marianna, her sister for a statement of her origin, which included a term from a Török marriage, as Tivadar Puskas was an American citizen. Date: 6/15/1942. In 1942, "Gülzar the Rose Garden" was published. February 1943 She will take part in a wreath-laying ceremony in Budapest on the occasion of the 50th anniversary of the telephone newsletter. It can be seen in the film of the Budapest Film Archive with the identification number mvh-0991-04. December 1, 1943 Vienna, Djavidan Hanum asks the master (Gerhardt Hauptmann) for a joint photo at the piano. 19.12.1944 Abbas Hilmi II dies. Djavidan Hanum will now use its name as Bayan / Djanan Djavidan. She appeared in Paris on March 17, 1951, where he lay unconscious on the sidewalk of Victor Hugo Avenue in Neuilly, in her age of 74, on Thursday afternoon. On April 14, 1951, she applied for the role of one of the chapters in the Queen for a Day series, which would have been shot in London. The English bureaucracy refused the visa to the 74-year-old. Djavidan Hanum went on strike in front of the English embassy, which was published in the French press in a sufficient amount. As the English position did not change under the influence of international public opinion, Djavidan Hanum returned to Austria in 1952, where he lived with his cousin at Hainfeld Castle for two years, and then in 1954 bought a small apartment in Graz, Wittekweg 7, on the 3rd floor. It was then, at the age of 77, that she began painting, alternating between beautiful Egyptian landscapes and nightmarish harem images, about 150 pieces. On February 1, 1959, an exhibition of his paintings was organized. On June 16, 1967, the Kleine Zeitung visited 90-year-old princessin. At the age of 91, she underwent acute heart failure and myocardial infarction. She rests in the Sankt Leonard Cemetery in Graz. 

During World War II she lived in Vienna and during the end of the war, moved to Innsbrück where she worked as an interpreter for the French Military Government in July 1945.

Ancestry

See also
List of consorts of the Muhammad Ali Dynasty
 Steiermärkischen Landtafel (EZ 1066)
 U.S. Immigration Service, ship passenger lists, passport
 The public notaries of the Budapest Metropolitan Archives resp. court archives
 Philadelphia city birth register 1877
 https://commons.wikimedia.org/wiki/File:Inheritance_lawsuits,_a_claim_lawsuit.jpg
 https://commons.wikimedia.org/w/index.php?title=Special:ListFiles/Lajokka&ilshowall=1

References 

Notes

External links

1877 births
1968 deaths
Converts to Islam
Egyptian royal consorts
Hungarian expatriates in Egypt
Hungarian nobility
Women memoirists
Morganatic spouses
Muhammad Ali dynasty
People from Philadelphia
American emigrants to Egypt
20th-century Egyptian people
20th-century Egyptian women
19th-century Hungarian women